John Ross Key (September 19, 1754 – October 11, 1821) was a lawyer, a commissioned officer in the Continental Army, a judge, and the father of writer Francis Scott Key.

Early life
Key was born in Redland, Frederick County, Maryland, to Francis Key (c.1731-1770) and his wife Ann (or “Anne”) Arnold Ross (1727-1811). Ross Key’s grandfather was English settler Philip Key who resided near Leonardtown around 1726, he married Susannah Gardiner and had seven children. His mother Anne Arnold Ross was the daughter of English parents John Ross (1696-1766) and Alicia Arnold (1700-1746) who married in St James's Church, Westminster.

Ann was a strong influence on her grandson Francis Scott Key when he lived with her near Annapolis when he was in school there.

Military, law career
Mustered into service at Frederick on June 21, 1775, Key was commissioned as a second lieutenant in Captain Thomas Price's Maryland Rifle Company. It was one of the first military forces from outside New England that came to aid General Washington at the siege of Boston, July–August 1775. By 1781 Key was a captain. He commanded a Frederick County Company of Cavalry during the Yorktown Campaign.

He was later a justice of the peace, a judge, and associate justice of his judicial district, which comprised Allegany, Washington and Frederick Counties. His brother Philip Barton Key, also an attorney arranged for his nephew Francis to study law under his friend, Judge Jeremiah Townley Chase in 1800 and with whom he would later be a partner in Georgetown. Francis took the practice over entirely when his uncle ran for Congress.

Personal life
He married Ann Phoebe Penn Dagworthy Charlton at the city of Frederick on October 19, 1775. Six children were born to the couple, but only three reached maturity. Francis Scott Key, his sister Anne Arnold Phoebe Charlton Key who would marry Roger Brooke Taney and John Alfred Key who died at Edgefield, South Carolina.

Death
Key died at the age of 67 in Frederick City and was interred there at Mount Olivet Cemetery.

References

External links
 

1754 births
1821 deaths
People from Frederick County, Maryland
Continental Army officers from Maryland
Maryland state court judges
Burials at Mount Olivet Cemetery (Frederick, Maryland)
Key family of Maryland